King-Casper-Ward-Bazemore House, also known as the Cling Bazemore House, is a historic home located near Ahoskie, Hertford County, North Carolina.  It was built about 1805, and is a two-story, three bay, Federal period frame dwelling with a truncated hip roof.  It is sheathed in beaded siding and has two brick chimneys.  The house was moved to its present site in 1980.

It was listed on the National Register of Historic Places in 1982.

References

Houses on the National Register of Historic Places in North Carolina
Federal architecture in North Carolina
Houses completed in 1805
Houses in Hertford County, North Carolina
National Register of Historic Places in Hertford County, North Carolina
1805 establishments in North Carolina